Loday is a surname. Notable people with the surname include:

 Jean-Louis Loday (1946–2012), French mathematician
 Kuenga Loday (born  1977), Bhutanese politician
 Yves Loday (born 1955), French sailor